Hatred: Destruction = Construction is the eighth full-length album released by the Japanese horror punk band Balzac. It was released with four different covers and one special 666mm edition. The album has two hidden tracks. The first is "Tomorrow Never Comes" and starts at the end of the song "Destruction = Construction" after a brief period of silence. When the final song of the albums ends, three other tracks on silence are played before the final song, "World Without Light", starts.

Track listing
"The Shadow of Daybreak I"
"(半狂乱) Distraction "
"Swallow the Dark"
"Dakedo, Sonna Hibi-no Naka-de Boku-ha"
"Momentary Degeneration"
"Hurt"
"Paranoia"
"Frankenstein's Walk"
"Destruction = Construction"
"Justice, Pity and Hatred"
"The Howling Wolf"
"Pray"
"The Shadows of Daybreak II"

Credits
 Hirosuke - vocals
 Atsushi - guitar, vocals, chorus
 Akio - bass guitar, chorus
 Takayuki - drums, chorus

Additional recording members
 Ryan - sampled vocals

External links
Official Balzac Japan site
Official Balzac USA site
Official Balzac Europe site 

2008 albums
Balzac (band) albums